Sambhu Lal Chakma is a Chakma singer and politician representing Chawmanu in the Tripura Legislative Assembly. He is the candidate of the BJP to win a seat for the party in the state.

References

1989 births
Living people
Indian Buddhists
Indian singers
Chakma people
Buddhist artists
Bharatiya Janata Party politicians from Tripura